Cofield may refer to:
Barry Cofield, American football player
Bill Cofield, American college basketball coach
Takoby Cofield (born 1992), Canadian football player
Cofield, North Carolina